{{safesubst:#invoke:RfD|||month = March
|day = 20
|year = 2023
|time = 18:18
|timestamp = 20230320181845

|content=
REDIRECT Killing of Daunte Wright

}}